Fire! is a 1991 Malian drama film directed by Adama Drabo. It was screened in the Un Certain Regard section at the 1991 Cannes Film Festival.

Ta Dona follows the story of Sidy, a Bambara young forest commissioner from the city, in Mali, who tries to stop a bush fires break out in a small village. Sidy has been trained in modern techniques. However, he accepts tradition and starts a journey into the Dogon country to find the seventh canari, an ancient herbal remedy for childbirth, believed to contain healing powers.

Through his journey, Sidy discovers that reforestation is the key to the future of his country.

Cast
 Djeneba Diawara - Koro
 Mamadou Fomba
 Balla Moussa Keita - Fakoro (as Balamoussa Keïta)
 Diarrah Sanogo - Gnedjougou
 Fily Traoré - Sidy

References

External links

1991 films
Malian drama films
Bambara-language films
1991 drama films
Films directed by Adama Drabo